The M-14 Motorway, also known as the Islamabad–Dera Ismail Khan Motorway and the Hakla–Yarik Motorway, is a four-lane North-South motorway in Pakistan. The  motorway is a part of the Western Alignment of the China–Pakistan Economic Corridor, and offers high speed road connections between the Islamabad-Rawalpindi metropolitan area, and the southern parts of Khyber Pakhtunkhwa province around Dera Ismail Khan.

The motorway was originally planned to open at the end of 2018, but due to delays, was inaugurated on 5 January 2022.

Route

The groundbreaking ceremony took place in May 2016. The four-lane controlled access motorway extends from the Hakla Interchange on the M-1 Motorway, near Fateh Jang in Punjab, to Dera Ismail Khan in Khyber Pakhtunkhwa.

From Hakla, the motorway extends in a southwestern direction, passing through the towns of Pindi Gheb, Jand, Tarap, and Mianwali. The route transverses the Sindh Sagar Doab region, and crosses the Indus River near Mianwali before entering into Khyber Pakhtunkhwa. The motorway continues onwards before terminating near the town of Yarik, just north of Dera Ismail Khan.

At the southern terminus of the new Islamabad-Dera Ismail Khan motorway, the N-50 National Highway will also be upgraded between Dera Ismail Khan-Zhob and between Zhob-Quetta.

Specifications
The motorway has 11 interchanges, 36 bridges, 33 flyovers and 119 underpasses. It also has a 100 meter-wide right of way in order to widen the four lane road to six lanes in future as traffic volume increases.

Road safety
Various commuters have identified an exact spot on M-14 where multiple accidents had taken place till January 2022.  As a result, the NHA initiated a technical investigation to discover any technical fault on the road surface. So, far the investigation has turned up only over-speeding in rain as the cause of accidents in that particular section of the road.

Construction 
Pakistan's Executive Committee of the National Economic Council (ECNEC) approved construction of this section of roadway in April 2016, while construction commenced in May 2016. Construction was completed by December 2021.

Construction proceeded in five packages:
 Package 1: Yarik-Rehmanikhel section (contract awarded to M/s NLC).
 Package 2: Rehmanikhel-Kot Belian section (contract awarded to M/s SKB-KNK JV)
 Package 3:  Beruli-Tarap section (contract awarded to M/s FWO)
 Package 4:  Tarap-Pindi Gheb section (contract awarded to M/s Limak-ZKB JV)
 Package 5:  Pindi Gheb-Hakla Interchange section (ccontract awarded to M/s Limak-ZKB JV)

Interchanges

See also
 Motorways of Pakistan
 Roads in Pakistan
Peshawar–D.I. Khan motorway

References

External links
 nha.gov.pk/wp-content/uploads/2016/07/Press-Release-30.06.2016.pdf

M14
M
China–Pakistan Economic Corridor